The following units and commanders participated in the Lorraine campaign from September 1 to December 18, 1944.

U.S. Third Army
Lieutenant General George S. Patton Jr.
 Chief of Staff: Major General Hugh Gaffey

German Army Group G
Army Group G was commanded by General der Panzertruppe Hermann Balck.

Balck, who had since August been in charge of the Fourth Panzer Army on the Eastern Front took command on 21 September replacing Johannes Blaskowitz who had lost a substantial amount of his forces in the retreat following the Allied invasion of the south of France.

His Chief of Staff was Friedrick von Mellenthin

The 1st Army (1. Armee) was commanded by General der Panzertruppe Otto von Knobelsdorff

XIII SS Army Corps 
XIII SS Army Corps was commanded by Generalleutnant der Waffen-SS Hermann Prieß

LXXXIX Corps

LXXXIX Corps, General der infanterie Gustav Höhne (took command 7 September 1944)
 361st Volksgrenadier Division (Generalmajor Alfred Philippi, appointed 1 September 1944 )
 951st Grenadier Regiment
 952nd Grenadier Regiment
 953rd Grenadier Regiment
 361st Artillery Regiment
 361st Fusilier Battalion
 361st Tank Destroyer Company
 361st Engineer Battalion
 361st Signal Battalion
 361st Field Replacement Battalion
 361st Divisional Supply Troops
 553rd Infantry Division
 1119th Regiment
 1120th Regiment

LXXXII Corps
LXXXII Corps, General der Infanterie Walter Hörnlein

Notes

Sources
 Balkoski, Joseph. " Patton's 3rd Army: The Lorraine Campaign, 8 Nov. – 1 Dec. '44" in Strategy & Tactics, no. 78 (January/February 1980).
 Mitcham, Jr., Samuel W. German Order of Battle, volume 1: 1st–290th Infantry Divisions in WW II. Mechanicsburg, Pennsylvania: Stackpole Books, 2007. .
 Mitcham, Jr., Samuel W. German Order of Battle'', volume 2: 291st–999th Infantry Divisions, Named Infantry Divisions, and Special Divisions in WWII. Mechanicsburg, Pennsylvania: Stackpole Books, 2007. .

World War II orders of battle